John Webbe (by 1516 – 1556/1557), of London and Faversham, Kent, was an English politician.

He was a Member of Parliament (MP) for Dover in October 1553, April 1554, and November 1554.

References

1550s deaths
Members of the Parliament of England for Dover
English MPs 1553 (Mary I)
Year of birth uncertain
English MPs 1554
English MPs 1554–1555